Live on the Resolution Tour is the sixth EP by Australian musician Matt Corby, released on 12 December 2013. The EP debuted and peaked at number 48 on the ARIA chart in December 2013.

Track listing

Charts

References

2013 EPs
Matt Corby albums
2013 live albums
Live EPs
Live albums by Australian artists